A Night of Fame is a 1949 Italian comedy film directed by Mario Monicelli and Steno.

Cast
 Marcel Cerdan as Maurice Cardan
 Ferruccio Tagliavini as Gino Marini
 Mischa Auer as Bernard Stork
 Marilyn Buferd as Ellen Rawlins
 Carlo Campanini as Emilio Poliazzi
 Leonardo Cortese as Prof. Franco Bresci
 Aldo Silvani as The Devil
 Giuseppe Pierozzi as Prince Khalashivar
 Cesare Polacco as Israelian Delegate
 Alba Arnova as Elena's Sister
 Folco Lulli as Ramirez
 Gianni Rizzo as Max
 William Tubbs as Antonio
 Albert Latasha as Marini's Manager
 Franca Marzi as Flora

References

External links

 

1949 films
1940s Italian-language films
1949 comedy films
Italian black-and-white films
Films directed by Mario Monicelli
Films directed by Stefano Vanzina
Italian comedy films
1940s Italian films